Alexander "Sasha" Hedges Steinberg (born June 25, 1987), known professionally as Sasha Velour, is an American drag queen, artist, actor, and stage and television producer, based in Brooklyn, New York. Velour is known for winning the ninth season of RuPaul's Drag Race, her drag revue NightGowns, and her one-queen theatrical work, Smoke & Mirrors.

Early life and education 
Born in Berkeley, California, Velour was raised in New Haven, Connecticut until the age of nine when her family moved to Urbana, Illinois. Velour is the only child of Mark Steinberg, a scholar of Russian history and professor in the Department of History at University of Illinois, Urbana-Champaign, and Jane Hedges, who served as editor at Yale University Press and managing editor of the Slavic Review. Velour is of Russian Jewish descent on her father's side, and identifies with her father's faith. Her grandmother emigrated from the Ukrainian Soviet Socialist Republic via Manchuria.

Velour graduated from University Laboratory High School in Champaign-Urbana in 2004. After high school, she spent a year abroad with family and worked as a part-time security guard at the Russian State Hermitage Museum in St. Petersburg, Russia, and interned at the Staatsoper (State Opera) in Berlin, Germany.

Velour obtained a BA from the Independent Program (with a focus on Modern Literatures) from Vassar College in 2009. In 2010, she was a Fulbright Scholar in Moscow and completed a project that aimed to understand the role of different art forms in contemporary Russian society. She received an MFA in cartooning in 2013 from the Center for Cartoon Studies in White River Junction, Vermont. Prior to pursuing drag as a full-time career, Velour worked as a freelance graphic designer and illustrator, an English language tutor, and as head of production for the children's book publisher, Toon Books.

Career

Early work in illustration and graphic design
Velour moved to New York with her partner John Jacob Lee (known professionally as Johnny Velour) in 2013. She created comics and zines that she self-published and sold at conventions. Velour's work was also published in The Nib, InkBRICK, Comics Workbook Magazine, QU33R, Cicada Magazine and others, under the names Sasha Velour and Sasha Steinberg. Velour also created a comic entitled Stonewall, which attempted to tell the story of the Stonewall riots using real and fictional characters. The work was called "a smart, beautiful and artful take on a significant and difficult historical event" by Highlow Comics. Velour's visual art has been the subject of two solo gallery shows. A show entitled “What's Your Drag” was on display at Be Gallery NYC in spring 2014 (in connection with BeFluent, the English school where she taught), and another solo show entitled "Nightrooms", was held at the Black Box Gallery (located in Bizarre Bushwick) in Brooklyn in March 2016. Velour's cut paper work was part of the group show "Coney Island Babies, Visual Artists from the Brooklyn Drag Scene" at the Bureau of General Services Queer Division that opened in Manhattan in November 2012. In March 2017, Velour designed a long sleeve T-shirt for "Contemporary Drag", a limited-edition fashion line for the New Art Dealers Alliance's (NADA) in collaboration with Print All Over Me and she performed at the NADA show that month.

Early drag 
Velour started performing in drag while studying at The Center for Cartoon Studies in Vermont. She also met her partner John Jacob Lee (known as Johnny Velour) in Vermont when he was acting in a production of Annie. In the spring of 2013, Velour and her partner staged Whatever She Wants, A Drag Musicale at the Main Street Museum featuring local residents. She called producing the show a "milestone" of her drag career and moved to Brooklyn later that year.

Velour began performing in New York City in early 2014. She founded Velour, The Drag Magazine (originally named Vym), a magazine about drag, alongside partner Johnny in the summer of 2014. The magazine included interviews as well as varied art forms such as photography, poetry, and illustration that address the power, beauty, and purpose of drag. Three issues were published over two years and the magazine was compiled into a 300 page hardcover book in 2018.

Velour began producing a monthly drag show, NightGowns, in August 2015, at Bizarre Bushwick. The show has been regularly hosted at Bizarre Bushwick and National Sawdust, both in Brooklyn New York. The shows have been celebrated as "beautiful and funny and politically charged" by The New York Times. It was later adapted into a TV series for Quibi.

RuPaul's Drag Race
Velour auditioned for RuPaul's Drag Races eighth season but was not selected to participate. In 2017, she competed in and ultimately won the ninth season of the show. Velour's lip sync to Whitney Houston's "So Emotional" in the season finale was named “performance of the year” by The A.V. Club and was also named one of "TV's Best Musical Moments" by Entertainment Weekly. The lip-sync was later referenced on Saturday Night Live, during Kate McKinnon's impression of Elizabeth Warren.

During the airing of the show, Velour starred in the music video for the non-record single "C.L.A.T." alongside fellow New York City drag artists Peppermint, Aja and Alexis Michelle, all of whom also appeared on the ninth season of Drag Race.

Post-Drag Race success 
Velour founded The House of Velour in 2017, a production company that she uses to produce stage, film work and merchandise. KC Ifeyani at Fast Company said the company was "disrupting the business of drag". Velour expanded her drag showcase NightGowns, moving it from Bizarre Bushwick to National Sawdust in April 2017. The show also toured to Los Angeles, London, and played at Terminal 5 in New York City, with Janet Jackson in attendance.

In 2018, Velour partnered with Opening Ceremony to host and direct their New York Fashion Week show. Velour selected 40 LGBTQ+ models to walk, creating the first all queer show in New York Fashion Week history. The show featured other notable drag performers (Lypsinka, Shea Couleé, Jiggly Caliente, Miss Fame, Farrah Moan, Hungry, and more) as well as a surprise performance from Christina Aguilera.

In 2017, Google commissioned Velour to create a Google Doodle of German singer-actress Marlene Dietrich which appeared on Google's homepage on December 27, 2017, the 116th anniversary of Dietrich's birth. Velour impersonated Dietrich in the Snatch Game challenge on season 9 of RuPaul's Drag Race. For the 50th anniversary of the Stonewall uprising in 2019, Velour published a detailed history comic about the events of that night titled Three Dollar Riot. She had first begun working on the comic years before for her thesis project at the Center for Cartoon Studies; a previous version of the comic was published in 2012 under the name Stonewall.

Variety featured Velour in the "Power of New York List 2019", and she appeared in Outs annual OUT100 list twice (2017 and 2019). In June 2019, a panel of judges from New York magazine placed Velour 12th on their list of "the most powerful drag queens in America", a ranking of 100 former Drag Race contestants.

During a period of isolation brought on by the COVID-19 pandemic in the summer of 2021, Velour produced a series of papier-mâché masks called "Faces of Drag", which honors ten pioneers in "the world history of drag". Those highlighted by the series include Izumo no Okuni, Rebecca and Her Daughters, William Dorsey Swann, Mei Lanfang, Barbette, Josephine Baker, Coccinelle, José Sarria, and Divine.

Velour has spoken at the Teen Vogue Summit (June 2018), The Long Conversation at the Smithsonian in Washington, D.C. (Dec. 2018) and for colleges including Purdue, The University of Illinois at Urbana Champaign, Columbia, Oakland University, and more. Velour has spoken on panels hosted by Lyft, Netflix, Mercedes Benz, Fast Company, Jewish Queer Youth, and more.

Velour has appeared on the covers of Wussy Mag, Plastik Magazine, Bricks, GayTimes, and she art-directed her pet Italian Greyhound, Vanya's, cover shoot of Dog Magazine which featured an interview with Velour. Her home was featured in People magazine.

TV and film work 
In 2018, Velour self-produced a short film entitled Pirate Jenny, which included Velour performing her own translation of the famous The Threepenny Opera song of the same name. The work was shown as part of the group art show "Bona Drag: An Incomplete History of Drag and Cross-Gender Performance in Film and Video Art (Part 1)" at the Rhode Island School of Design that opened in November 2018.

In 2019, Velour appeared as herself on episodes of the television shows The Bold Type and Broad City.

Velour adapted her stage show NightGowns into an 8-episode docu-series for the short-form platform Quibi, and it premiered on April 6, 2020. She was executive producer and starred in the show, and produced it with the Documentary Group and music video director Sophie Muller. NightGowns followed Velour and a cast of drag performers across eight episodes as she transforms NightGowns into a full-blown stage act. The New York Times said it was "among the most life-affirming shows you could find on any platform". A second season was ordered in August 2020, but Quibi ceased operations in late 2020. In 2021, NightGowns won the RealScreen Award for "Digital Content, Short Form Content, Non-Fiction”.

In March 2021, Velour starred in Angélica Negrón's The Island We Made, a short art-opera film commissioned by Opera Philadelphia. The film was directed by Matthew Placek.

Smoke & Mirrors

On January 9, 2019, Velour premiered her first evening-length solo theater show, Smoke & Mirrors, in Canberra, Australia during a seven-city tour of Australia and New Zealand produced by ITD Events. The US premiere of Smoke & Mirrors was held on March 21, 2019 at New York Live Arts where it played eight sold-out shows. In May 2019, Velour performed the show at The Theatre At The Ace in Los Angeles, and on August 9 and 10, 2019, she performed two sold-out shows at the O2 Shepherd's Bush Empire in London. The show was also performed at Purdue University and the University of Illinois at Urbana-Champaign that fall.

A 23-city (24 show) tour of the US and Canada opened in San Antonio, Texas on October 21, 2019 and closed in San Francisco, California on November 30, 2019. A 16-city tour of the United Kingdom and the European Union opened on March 2, 2020, in Birmingham, England. After seven performances, the tour was cut short due to the COVID-19 pandemic. The last performance was played in Dublin, Ireland on March 11, 2020. The European tour resumed in February 2022, playing in often sold-out theaters in 36 cities in 17 countries, reaching from Ireland to Poland.

Personal life 
, Velour resides in Brooklyn, New York, with partner Johnny Velour and her pet Italian greyhound, Vanya. Velour is gender-fluid and uses she/they pronouns when not in drag. Her drag persona, Sasha Velour, is referred to as "she".

Velour has a shaved head. She often performs in drag bald, as a tribute to her mother, Jane Hedges, who died of cancer in 2015 and had lost her hair during treatment for the disease.

Filmography

Television

Web series

Short Film

Published works

Awards and nominations

See also
 LGBT culture in New York City
 List of LGBT people from New York City

References

External links 

 

1987 births
Living people
American drag queens
American feminists
American people of Russian-Jewish descent
People with non-binary gender identities
LGBT comics creators
LGBT people from Connecticut
LGBT people from Illinois
Nightlife in New York City
Sasha Velour
Vassar College alumni
Non-binary drag performers
Center for Cartoon Studies alumni
Fulbright alumni
University Laboratory High School (Urbana, Illinois) alumni